The Colonial Coast Birding Trail of Georgia is a wildlife trail that is not a really a "trail", but a series of 18 sites that have been chosen for their excellent birdwatching opportunities.

There are documented sightings in Georgia of at least 413 different bird species. More than 300 species of birds have been documented along Georgia's Colonial Birding Trail. Many of the 18 sites of the Trail have historic buildings, ruins, or historic locations from the 18th and/or 19th centuries.

Sites 
Information below is presented in more detail in the Georgia's Colonial Coast Birding Trail, Georgia DNR - Wildlife Resources Division (and is the source material for table).

References

External links
 Georgia's Colonial Coast Birding Trail - Georgia Wildlife Resources Division
Other Birding Resources, Georgia Ornithological Society

Birdwatching sites in the United States
Protected areas of Georgia (U.S. state)
National Wildlife Refuges in Georgia (U.S. state)
Tourist attractions in Georgia (U.S. state)
Wilderness areas of Georgia (U.S. state)